Red Roulette: An Insider’s Story of Wealth, Power, Corruption, and Vengeance in Today’s China is a 2021 memoir by Desmond Shum (ghost-written by John Pomfret).

James Palmer of Foreign Policy wrote that the work serves as "one of the very few insider accounts we have of how things get done at the top in China".

Background
Shum's former wife Whitney Duan Weihong, under arrest and incommunicado since 2017, placed a telephone call to Shum telling him to cancel the publication. Jude Blanchette of the Center for Strategic and International Studies (CSIS) wrote in The Washington Post that the party attempted to use Duan and Shum's family as hostages to convince him to not go forward with publishing.

Palmer explained that Shum, by writing the book and publishing it, went against the "omertà" of the Chinese Communist Party (CCP).

Contents
The work discusses how doing favors for other people becomes the backbone of guanxi personal relationships in China, and Palmer stated the "tragedy of those ties" becomes an important thematic element. The book states how Shum and Duan formed a corrupt relationship with Zhang Peili and became wealthy as a result. Blanchette stated that the Zhang Peili connection is in the "heart" of the work.

Blanchette wrote that the CCP is depicted in the work as being "the epitome of capitalist excess". Blanchette added that the work shows that actual decisions go through "informal interactions" between key power brokers, with official meetings being for show; he stated that this "highlight[s] the limitations of more formalistic analysis of China’s political system."

Reception
Palmer wrote in terms of the author's assessment of himself within the work, as Shum was someone previously pro-CCP who later turned against the party, "unusually honest—though not completely frank".

Blanchette called the work "a remarkable indictment of the Chinese Communist Party" and "a rare bona fide insider account".

Publishers Weekly gave the book a starred review and stated that the book has an "enthralling" critique of the CCP and "is imbued with an aura of inevitable tragedy".

Kirkus Reviews described the book as "riveting".

References

2021 non-fiction books
Books about China
Chinese memoirs